China Yindonli–Wildto Cycling Team was a Chinese UCI Continental cycling team established in 2013.

2016 Team roster

References

UCI Continental Teams (Asia)
Cycling teams established in 2013
Cycling teams disestablished in 2017
Cycling teams based in China